The Nissan J series are straight-4 and straight-6 gasoline internal combustion engines produced by Nissan from the 1960s through the 1980s. It is similar to the BMC B-Series engine that was built in Japan under licence as the Nissan 1H before being de-stroked to become the 1.0 L Nissan C and 1.2 L Nissan E engines, but wasn't a direct copy.

Straight-4

J13
It was also produced for the Datsun 520 and 521 trucks from 1967 to 1969 when it was replaced by the Nissan L engine. Mexican-assembled Bluebird 510s also received the J13 engine.

J15
The J13 was bored out to produce the J15, which was introduced in the Datsun 521 truck in 1969 and saw use in various Nissan pickup trucks like the 620 and 720 in various overseas markets through the 1970s and 1980s. It was also used in certain sedans like the 710. It was also used in the PA321 Datsun Cabstar. The J15 produces . Max torque at 3400rpm with 12.0 kg.

J16
A  iteration of the OHV J-series four cylinders was also built, mainly for utility vehicles. This engine was also installed by Nissan's Taiwanese partner Yue Loong in several iterations of the Nissan Violet, long after Nissan themselves had stopped using OHV engines in passenger cars.

Applications:
 1972.09-1976.01 Nissan/Datsun Homer, Cabstar T20-series ( at 5,400 rpm)
 Yue Loong Violet 707 - Taiwanese built Nissan Violet ( SAE at 5,200 rpm)
E23 Urvan some markets.
 1972-1976 Nissan Homer T20
 1979-1982 Nissan Datsun 720

J18
The J18 is a 1.8 L engine that was used in various Nissan models built in Mexico.

Straight-6

J20
The J20 is a  inline-6 engine. It produces  and was used in the 1966-1969 Nissan Cedric. The J20 is basically a J13 with two extra cylinders.

See also
 Datsun Truck
 List of Nissan engines
 Nissan

References

J
Straight-four engines
Straight-six engines
Gasoline engines by model